Racinoa obliquisigna is a moth in the family Bombycidae. It was described by George Hampson in 1910. It is found in Angola and Kenya.

References

Bombycidae
Moths described in 1910